Loke pri Mozirju is a settlement in the Municipality of Mozirje in northern Slovenia. It lies on the right bank of the Savinja River south of Mozirje. The area is part of the traditional region of Lower Styria. The municipality is now included in the Savinja Statistical Region.

Name
The name of the settlement was changed from Loke to Loke pri Mozirju in 1955.

References

External links
Loke pri Mozirju on Geopedia

Populated places in the Municipality of Mozirje